Whicker is a surname. Notable people with the surname include:

Alan Whicker (1921–2013), British journalist and broadcaster
Whicker's World, British television documentary series that ran from 1959 to 1988 that he presented
Fred Whicker (1901–1966), Australian artist

Fictional characters
Paul Whicker, fictional comic book vicar from the adult comic Viz

See also
Wicker (disambiguation)